Richard Murrie (born 25 June 1955) is a former Australian rules footballer who played for Footscray, Geelong and Richmond in the Victorian Football League (VFL).

A defender from South Australia where he played for Sturt, Murrie was a regular fixture in the Footscray team of the late 1970s before crossing to Geelong. His only finals appearances came while at Geelong in 1981 and included a preliminary final loss.

Murrie had a brief stint with Richmond and then began playing for Box Hill in the VFA. He was the captain-coach and centre half back in Box Hill's 1986 division two premiership team.

References

Holmesby, Russell and Main, Jim (2007). The Encyclopedia of AFL Footballers. 7th ed. Melbourne: Bas Publishing.

1955 births
Living people
Western Bulldogs players
Geelong Football Club players
Richmond Football Club players
Box Hill Football Club players
Box Hill Football Club coaches
Australian rules footballers from the Australian Capital Territory